The 2019 Croatia Open  (also known as the Plava Laguna Croatia Open Umag for sponsorship reasons) was a men's tennis tournament played on outdoor clay courts. It was the 30th edition of the Croatia Open, and part of the 250 Series of the 2019 ATP Tour. It took place at the International Tennis Center in Umag, Croatia, from 15 July through 21 July 2019.

ATP singles main draw entrants

Seeds 

 1 Rankings are as of July 1, 2019

Other entrants 
The following players received wildcards into the singles main draw:
  Viktor Galović
  Nino Serdarušić
  Jannik Sinner

The following player received entry using a protected ranking into the main draw:
  Cedrik-Marcel Stebe

The following players received entry from the qualifying draw:
  Attila Balázs 
  Salvatore Caruso
  Peter Torebko 
  Marco Trungelliti

Withdrawals 
Before the tournament
  Márton Fucsovics → replaced by  Facundo Bagnis
  Malek Jaziri → replaced by  Pedro Sousa
  Guido Pella → replaced by  Stefano Travaglia

Retirements 
  Fabio Fognini

ATP doubles main draw entrants

Seeds 

 Rankings are as of July 1, 2019

Other entrants 
The following pairs received wildcards into the doubles main draw:
 Tomislav Brkić /  Ante Pavić
 Antonio Šančić /  Nino Serdarušić

The following pair received entry as alternates:
 Daniel Altmaier /  Rudolf Molleker

Withdrawals 
During the tournament
 Fabio Fognini

Champions

Men's singles 

  Dušan Lajović def.  Attila Balázs, 7–5, 7–5

Men's doubles 

  Robin Haase /  Philipp Oswald def.  Oliver Marach /  Jürgen Melzer,  7–5, 6–7(2–7), [14–12]

References

External links 
 Official website

Croatia Open Umag
2019
2019 in Croatian tennis
Croatia Open Umag